The Chamois Coloured Goat, is an indigenous breed of domestic goat from Switzerland. It is distributed throughout Switzerland and in parts of northern Italy and Austria, and has been exported to other countries including France. There are two strains, a horned type from the Grisons or Graubünden in the eastern part of the country, and a hornless type from the former bezirk of Oberhasli and the area of Brienz and Lake Brienz in the Bernese Oberland in central Switzerland. In some countries the hornless variety may be considered a separate breed, the Oberhasli goat. The Swiss herd-book was established in 1930.

Registration and numbers 

In Switzerland the Chamois Coloured Goat is among the principal national goat breeds for which a herd-book is kept by the Schweizerischer Ziegenzuchtverband, the Swiss federation of cantonal goat breeders' associations. In Italy, under the name Camosciata delle Alpi, it is one of the eight autochthonous Italian goat breeds for which a genealogical herd-book is kept by the Associazione Nazionale della Pastorizia, the Italian national association of sheep- and goat-breeders; the Italian herd-book was activated in 1973.

At the end of 2013 the number reported for Switzerland was 13,000 and the registered population in Italy was 6237. A population of 2526–3000 was reported from Austria in 2012.

Use 

References 

Goat breeds
Dairy goat breeds
Goat breeds originating in Italy
Goat breeds originating in Switzerland